Chilling Adventures of Sabrina is an American supernatural horror web television series developed by Roberto Aguirre-Sacasa for Netflix, based on the Archie Horror comic book series of the same name. The series is produced by Warner Bros. Television, in association with Berlanti Productions and Archie Comics. Aguirre-Sacasa and Greg Berlanti serve as executive producers, alongside Sarah Schechter, Jon Goldwater, and Lee Toland Krieger.

On July 8, 2020, Netflix cancelled the series.

Series overview

Episodes

Part 1 (2018)

Part 2 (2019)

Part 3 (2020)

Part 4 (2020)

References 

Lists of American horror television series episodes
Lists of American supernatural television series episodes